Dorchester High School may refer to:

Dorchester High School (Massachusetts) (1852–2003) in the Dorchester neighborhood of Boston, Massachusetts, United States
Dorchester High School for Girls (1925–1953) in the Dorchester neighborhood of Boston, Massachusetts, United States
Dorchester High School (Nebraska) in Dorchester, Nebraska, United States
Lord Dorchester Secondary School in Dorchester, Ontario, Canada

See also
 Dorchester (disambiguation)